William Hope (born March 2, 1955) is a Canadian actor.

Career
Most of Hope's stage work has been leading roles in a wide variety of regional, touring and West End theatres in England.

Early on, he turned down a major role in Kubrick's Full Metal Jacket for a lead role in James Cameron's Aliens (1986) as Lt. Gorman, for which he began to receive recognition. Soon after he appeared as Kyle MacRae in the horror film Hellbound: Hellraiser II (1988), the sequel to Clive Barker's Hellraiser (1987).

After Hellbound, Hope went on to a number of theatrical films while working a lot on stage and in radio drama. Seen in parts in Shining Through (1992) and The Saint (1997), Sky Captain and the World of Tomorrow (2004) and XXX (2002). He co-starred in two Wesley Snipes' action epics The Marksman (2005) and The Detonator (2006) and as the villain in Steven Seagal's action movie Submerged (2005).

Recently seen on TV as Harry Ramos in the award-winning TV docudrama 9/11: The Twin Towers (2007), and as the President of Lehman Brothers in The Last Days of Lehman Brothers (2009) starring James Cromwell, in theatrical releases he has been seen opposite Woody Harrelson in The Walker (2007), Robert Downey Jr. in Sherlock Holmes (2009), and The Whistleblower (2010) with Rachel Weisz and Legacy with Idris Elba. His most recent television work included playing Matt LeBlanc's agent in Episodes (2011). He was also in Luc Besson's The Lady (2012) about the life of Aung San Suu Kyi and in 2011 he guest-starred in the BBC's final series of Spooks (2002) and alongside Johnny Depp in Tim Burton's Dark Shadows (2012).

From 2009 to 2021, he has been heard providing voices for Edward, Toby, Whiff, Rocky and Farmer McColl in the US dub and also Bert of the Thomas & Friends children's TV and DVD series. He also returned to the horror genre, working in the Solar Film's experimental Dark Floors, released in Europe in 2008.  He is regularly heard on BBC Radio and is part of the BBC "Broken News" cast. He appeared in a book tour with Tim Parfitt, his brother-in-law.

Filmography

Film

Television

Self
McLibel (1998) – Guardian Newspaper Representative
Superior Firepower: The Making of 'Aliens (2003) (V) – Himself
Mummies: Secrets of the Pharaohs (2007) – Charles Wilbour

Video games

References

External links

William Hope at Flixster
William Hope at TV Guide
William Hope at Fandango
William Hope films at New York Times

Living people
1955 births
Canadian emigrants to England
Canadian male film actors
Canadian male television actors
Canadian male video game actors
Canadian male voice actors
Male actors from Montreal
Alumni of RADA
20th-century Canadian male actors
21st-century Canadian male actors